The BRM P230 was an open-wheel Formula One racing car, designed and developed by Aubrey Woods, and built by British constructor BRM, for the 1979 Aurora AFX F1 1979 British Formula One Championship, but never raced. It was due to be driven by Neil Bettridge, and like its predecessor was going to be powered by a nearly  BRM V12 engine, and run on Goodyear tyres. It later became the basis for the unraced BRM Hepworth GB-1 Can-Am car.

References

BRM Formula One cars